Srimad Andavan Arts and Science College is a general degree college located in Tiruchirappalli, Tamil Nadu. The college is affiliated with Bharathidasan University. and offers different courses in arts, commerce and science.This  college conduct modelling sessions such as ramp walks fashion shows under "Shishyas Event Programme" during Culturals organised by Aravind Laboratories.

Accreditation
The college is recognized by the University Grants Commission (UGC).

References

External links
http://andavancollege.ac.in/

Colleges affiliated to Bharathidasan University
Universities and colleges in Tiruchirappalli